Central Jail Dera Ghazi Khan is a historic jail of Pakistan. Imran Khan spent several months in this jail during General Musharraf's rule.

 Government of Punjab, Pakistan
 Punjab Prisons (Pakistan)
 Prison Officer
 Headquarter Jail
 National Academy for Prisons Administration

References

Prisons in Pakistan